Sonqor County is in Kermanshah province, Iran. The capital of the county is the city of Sonqor. At the 2006 census, the county's population was 95,904 in 23,755 households. The following census in 2011 counted 91,935 people in 26,201 households. At the 2016 census, the county's population was 81,661 in 25,554 households. The majority of the people in this county are Kurds and Turkics.

Administrative divisions

The population history of Sonqor County's administrative divisions over three consecutive censuses is shown in the following table. The latest census shows two districts, eight rural districts, and two cities.

Demographics
Sonqor county is made up of two distinct population elements. The city of Sonqor and the villages of Qalʿa-ye Farhād Khan and Qorva are predominantly populated by Turkics, whose ancestors reportedly arrived during the Mongol domination of Iran. The Turkic people of Sonqor originally speak the Sonqori dialect. The dialects of Sonqori spoken in Qalʿa-ye Farhād Khan and Qorva differ barely from this main dialect.

The other areas within Sonqor County are predominantly populated by Kurds most of whom have originally been agriculturalists. The chiefs of the Kurds of Sonqor County belonged to the Kulya'i tribe. These Kurdish feudal lords (khans) were in control of the Kurdish-populated parts of the county until early 20th century Qajar Iran, and were reportedly scions (in the eighth generation) of a certain Safi Khan who lived in the later Safavid period. In 1786, the district was ceded to Ardalan as a gift from Agha Mohammad Khan Qajar. In 1798, Ali Hemmat Khan and his brother Baba Khan of the Nanakali tribe were executed by Iranian ruler Fath-Ali Shah Qajar (1797-1834) as they had supported Soleyman Khan, the pretender to the Iranian throne. The Kulya'i Kurds of the Sonqor District speak a Kurdish dialect that resembles the dialect of Kermanshah, and, according to the second edition of the Encyclopaedia of Islam are thought to be affiliated to the Ahl-e Haqq syncretic religion. At least 177 villages in the county speak the Kulya'i dialect, 112 of these are in the Kolyai District.

References

Sources
 

 

 

Counties of Kermanshah Province